Brian is a masculine given name and surname.

Brian may also refer to:

Mononymous uses
Brian (mythology), a figure in Celtic mythology
Brian (Korean American singer), Brian Joo (born 1981)
The Brian, a 2006 album by Brian Joo
Brian (dog), original name of Bing, a dog who served in the British Army in World War II
Brian (The Larry Sanders Show), a character on the sitcom The Larry Sanders Show
Brian, a character in the American TV miniseries V (1983) and V The Final Battle (1984)
 Brian, a snail character in the children's television programme The Magic Roundabout

Other uses
 Brian, Missouri, a community in the United States
 Brian (software), a software package for neural network simulations

See also
Brian and Michael, British musical duo 
Bryan (disambiguation)